The Cross Valley Corridor is a proposed passenger rail service in the California Central Valley, connecting Visalia, Hanford, Porterville, and surrounding cities to each other and California High-Speed Rail's planned Kings–Tulare Regional Station.

Design

Route
The  route is proposed to run east–west, mostly along existing tracks.  These rights-of way were originally constructed in the 1870s and 1880s by the Southern Pacific Railroad, which founded all the cities along the corridor when it first laid tracks, with the exception of the older city of Visalia. The tracks are currently owned by the Union Pacific Railroad (UPRR), with the San Joaquin Valley Railroad operating on nearly all of the corridor, except for a  portion of the Union Pacific mainline connecting the eastern and western branches near Goshen.

The specific subdivisions projected for re-use as the CVC are:
 Hanford Subdivision (owned by UPRR), from Huron to SR 99
 Goshen Subdivision (UPRR), from SR 99 to Exeter
 Exeter Subdivision (UPRR), from Exeter to Lindsay
 Exeter right-of-way (City of Porterville), from Lindsay to Porterville

The projected termini are in Porterville (east) and Huron (west); the route follows SR 198 and SR 65. The easternmost  of the route between Strathmore and Porterville were abandoned and the tracks pulled up, but the land was purchased by the City of Porterville to preserve the right-of-way.

Stations

Phased implementation
In a projected Phase 1 to occur within ten years of opening CAHSR service, existing and new local bus services from cities along the projected CVC route would be coordinated to run to the planned Kings/Tulare high-speed rail station. Phase 2 would replace bus services within 20 years of opening CAHSR for the central portion of CVC, between Lemoore and Visalia, and open a rail maintenance facility in that segment. Phase 3, set to begin more than 20 years after CAHSR, would complete the entire CVC rail service; within Tulare County, bus services would connect the CVC station in Visalia with local communities.

History 
Initial studies of a passenger rail service were conducted in the mid-1990s.  A Cross Valley Rail Corridor Joint Powers Authority was founded, which raised $14.2 million from government and private sources to resurface the rail corridor in 2002–2003 to accommodate heavier freight traffic, and keep the line in operation in preparation for a passenger rail service.  A 2004 study revisited passenger rail plans.

California High-Speed Rail offered $600,000 in funding for a station planning grant including the Cross Valley Corridor, providing that the City of Hanford (which is in Kings County) and Tulare County each provided $100,000 in matching funds.  Hanford and Kings County have strongly opposed the high-speed rail project, while Visalia and Tulare County have supported it.  In August 2015, the Hanford City Council voted not to spend the funds, but Tulare County officials proceeded with the planning process.

In April 2017, the Tulare County Association of Governments released an existing conditions report.  In June 2018, it approved a final plan. The line was included in the 2018 California State Rail Plan as part of the 2040 Vision.

References

External links 
 Cross Valley Corridor Plan - Tulare County Association of Governments

Proposed railway lines in California
Public transportation in Fresno County, California
Public transportation in Kings County, California
Public transportation in Tulare County, California